The Misfit Wife is a 1920 American silent drama film directed by Edmund Mortimer and starring Alice Lake, Forrest Stanley and William Steele. It is based on the 1916 play The Outsider by Julie Herne.

Cast
 Alice Lake as 	Katie Malloy
 Forrest Stanley as Peter Crandall
 William Steele as 	Duff Simpson 
 Frederick Vroom as Dr. Morton
 Graham Pettie as Shad Perkins
 Edward Martindel as 	Henry Gilsey
 Leota Lorraine as 	Edith Gilsey
 Helen Pillsbury as 	Mrs. Crandall
 Jack Livingston as Bert McBride
 Jim Blackwell as 	The Porter

References

Bibliography
 Goble, Alan. The Complete Index to Literary Sources in Film. Walter de Gruyter, 1999.

External links
 

1920 films
1920 drama films
1920s English-language films
American silent feature films
Silent American drama films
American black-and-white films
Films directed by Edmund Mortimer
Metro Pictures films
1920s American films